Joe Salisbury and Jackson Withrow were the defending champions but chose not to defend their title.

Alex Lawson and Li Zhe won the title after defeating JC Aragone and Liam Broady 7–6(7–2), 6–3 in the final.

Seeds

Draw

References
 Main Draw

Challenger Banque Nationale de Granby - Men's Doubles
2018 Men's Doubles